The women's 200 metres event  at the 1996 European Athletics Indoor Championships was held in Stockholm Globe Arena on 9–10 March.

Medalists

Results

Heats
The winner of each heat (Q) and the next 6 fastest (q) qualified for the semifinals.

Semifinals
The winner of each semifinal (Q) and the next 1 fastest (q) qualified for the final. The following 4 fastest qualified for the B final.

Final

B final

References

200 metres at the European Athletics Indoor Championships
200
1996 in women's athletics